Gerald Oriol Jr., commonly known as Ti Gerald, was appointed Haiti’s Secretary of State for the Integration of Persons with Disabilities by President Michel Martelly in October 2011. From 2011 to 2016, he directed a staff of approximately 70 personnel working from seven offices throughout the country, which provided services to an estimated one million disabled persons. While in office, Oriol outlined the following objectives for the Bureau of the Secretary of State for the Integration of Persons with Disabilities (BSEIPH): advance the rights of persons with disabilities in Haiti; provide access to education for children with disabilities; create economic opportunities for persons with disabilities; promote the development of a physically accessible environment; and further develop the resources and capabilities of the BSEIPH.

In his post as Secretary with the disability portfolio, Oriol collaborated directly with organizations such as USAID, the World Bank, the European Union, the United Nations, and the Organization of American States. He has represented Haiti at disability conferences in Qatar, Ecuador, Panama and the United States.

Oriol also has extensive experience in the private and non-profit sectors. Prior to his appointment as Secretary, Oriol worked for several years as a consultant in the drinking water industry. He is also a shareholder in TECINA SA, a Haitian company specialized in the study, management and performance of construction projects.

In 2006, Oriol co-founded Fondation J’Aime Haiti [I Love Haiti Foundation], a non-profit that champions the rights of disabled and impoverished persons in Haiti. J’Aime Haiti developed several notable programs including L’Espoir par Education [Hope through Education], which awards scholarships to children of low-income familiese.

Oriol received his Bachelor of Science in Business Administration from the University of Florida and his Master of Liberal Arts from Harvard University Extension School.

Oriol resides in Port-au-Prince with his family.

References

External links

Government ministers of Haiti
Living people
Year of birth missing (living people)
Harvard Extension School alumni
University of Florida alumni